Serrodes mediopallens is a moth of the family Erebidae first described by Louis Beethoven Prout in 1924. It is found on the Society Islands, New Caledonia, Fiji, French Polynesia and in Australia.

Adults pierce fruits to suck the juice and are considered a pest of Citrus in French Polynesia.

References

Moths described in 1924
Serrodes